Vladimir Vladimirovich Klontsak (born 17 May 1994) is a Russian football defender.

Club career
He made his debut in the Russian Second Division for FC KAMAZ Naberezhnye Chelny on 5 June 2013 in a game against FC Nosta Novotroitsk. He made his Russian Football National League debut for KAMAZ on 11 July 2015 in a game against FC Gazovik Orenburg.

Personal
His father, also named Vladimir Klontsak, is a football manager and a former player.

References

External links
 
Career summary by sportbox.ru

1994 births
People from Almetyevsk
Living people
Russian footballers
Association football defenders
FC KAMAZ Naberezhnye Chelny players
FC Volga Ulyanovsk players
Sportspeople from Tatarstan